Wynnum State High School is a public high school in Wynnum, Brisbane, Queensland, Australia.

The current principal is Catherine Pfingst, and the Deputy Principals are Elizabeth Williams, Kim Hutchinson, Marina Williams and Lisa Hawkin.

Facilities at the school include:
 Basketball courts
 Pool
 Large sports oval
 Assembly hall
 Multi-Purpose Sports (MPS)
 Multiple classroom buildings
 Amphitheatre
Technology Studios
Science labs
library
Canteen

Construction also recently finished on a new block of four classrooms, dubbed the Russell Building or R Block (November, 2018).

Construction began in 1941, and the school first opened for students on 2 March 1942.
In 2010 there was 709 enrolled students, and 60 teachers.

Notable alumni 

Kyle Sandilands, radio host and television personality 
Belle Gibson, cookbook author and cancer fraudster
Samantha Riley, Olympic swimmer.
Associate Professor Dominic Berry, physicist specializing in quantum information and quantum optics.

References

External links

http://www.wynnumshs.eq.edu.au/documents/School-Annual-Report.pdf

Educational institutions established in 1942
Public high schools in Brisbane
Wynnum, Queensland
1942 establishments in Australia